Francesc Repiso Romero (born 27 January 1964 in Sant Julià de Lòria) is an Andorran sport shooter. He was selected to compete for the Andorran team in trap shooting at the 2004 Summer Olympics, finishing in last place out of thirty-five shooters. Romero is a member of La Rabassa Shooting Club in Andorra la Vella.

Romero qualified for the Andorran squad, as the oldest athlete (aged 40), in the men's trap at the 2004 Summer Olympics in Athens after having accepted a wildcard entry invitation from the International Shooting Sport Federation. He fired 106 out of 125 targets to round out the field in last place out of thirty-five shooters, failing to advance to the final.

References

External links

1964 births
Living people
Andorran male sport shooters
Olympic shooters of Andorra
Shooters at the 2004 Summer Olympics
People from Sant Julià de Lòria